Brachypremna is a genus of true crane fly.

Distribution
North and South America, the latter, by far being the most species rich.

Species
B. abitaguae Alexander, 1946
B. angusta Alexander, 1945
B. appendigera Alexander, 1946
B. arajuno Alexander, 1945
B. arcuaria Alexander, 1937
B. australis Alexander, 1923
B. basilica Alexander, 1921
B. brevigenua Alexander, 1945
B. breviterebra Alexander, 1944
B. breviventris (Wiedemann, 1821)
B. candida Alexander, 1912
B. candidella Alexander, 1969
B. clymene Alexander, 1945
B. dispellens (Walker, 1861)
B. diversipes Alexander, 1941
B. geijskesi Alexander, 1945
B. illudens Alexander, 1946
B. integristigma Alexander, 1940
B. itatiayana Alexander, 1944
B. karma Alexander, 1945
B. laetiventris Alexander, 1945
B. nigrofemorata Alexander, 1937
B. phrixus Alexander, 1953
B. pictipes Osten Sacken, 1888
B. pictiventris Alexander, 1945
B. quasimodo Alexander, 1943
B. sappho Alexander, 1943
B. similis Williston, 1900
B. subevanescens Alexander, 1962
B. subsimilis Alexander, 1921
B. subuniformis Alexander, 1945
B. thyestes Alexander, 1954
B. tigriventris Alexander, 1922
B. unicolor Osten Sacken, 1888
B. uniformis Alexander, 1920
B. variitibia Alexander, 1937
B. waigeuensis Alexander, 1948
B. williamsoni Alexander, 1912

References

Tipulidae
Tipuloidea genera
Diptera of North America
Diptera of South America